Anna Barbara Gignoux (1725–1796), was a German business person. She managed a substantial textile factory in Augsburg from 1761 onward, and was a major figure in the regional industrial development. She is mentioned in contemporary memoirs and was a patron of artists.

References
 Peter Fassl: Die Augsburger Kattunfabrikantin Anna Barbara Gignoux (1725–1796), in: Rainer A. Müller (Hg.), Unternehmer – Arbeitnehmer. Lebensbilder aus der Frühzeit der Industrialisierung in Bayern, München 1985, S. 153–159.

1725 births
1796 deaths
18th-century German businesspeople
German industrialists